Oon is a town in the Khargone district of Madhya Pradesh, India.

References

Villages in Khargone district